The United States Army Marksmanship Unit (USAMU or AMU) is a part of U.S. Army providing small arms marksmanship training for soldiers and enhancing Army recruiting. The unit was originally established in 1956 at the direction of president Dwight D. Eisenhower to the mission of winning international competitions, which at the time was dominated by the Soviet Union. At the 1964 Summer Olympics, the United States won seven medals in shooting, of which six were won by Army Marksmanship Unit members; unit members have continued to win medals at subsequent competitions. A 2008 New York Times article notes that the unit has "a reputation as the country's premier training school for competitive shooters." The unit has also trained army snipers and assisted in the development of weaponry.

Sections
The Army Marksmanship Unit consists of seven teams:
 Action Shooting Team
 Custom Firearms Shop
 Instructor Training Group
 International Rifle Team
 Service Pistol Team
 Service Rifle Team
 Shotgun Team

See also 
 Norwegian Armed Forces Shooting Committee
 List of shooting sports organizations

References

External links
USAMU Home Page
USAMU on Facebook

Shooting sports organizations
Marksmanship
Military units and formations established in 1956
1956 establishments in the United States